Janez Demšar (born 25 February 1951) is a Slovenian ski jumper. He competed in the normal hill and large hill events at the 1976 Winter Olympics.

References

1951 births
Living people
Slovenian male ski jumpers
Olympic ski jumpers of Yugoslavia
Ski jumpers at the 1976 Winter Olympics
Sportspeople from Jesenice, Jesenice